USCGC Morris (WSC-147), was a  United States Coast Guard Active-class patrol boat in commission from 1927 to 1971. She was named for Robert Morris, (1734–1806) who was appointed in 1789 as United States Senator from Pennsylvania. In May 1966, she was redesignated as (WMEC-147).

Development and design 
Active-class were designed for trailing the "mother ships" along the outer line of patrol during Prohibition. They were constructed at a cost of $63,173 each. They gained a reputation for durability that was only enhanced by their re-engining in the late 1930s; their original 6-cylinder diesels were replaced by significantly more powerful 8-cylinder units that used the original engine beds and gave the vessels an additional 3 knots. Ten were refitted as buoy tenders during the war and reverted to patrol work afterward.

Originally designated WPC, for patrol craft, they were re-designated WSC, for sub chaser, in February 1942, during World War II. The "W" appended to the SC (Sub Chaser) designation identified vessels as belonging to the U.S. Coast Guard. Those remaining in service in May 1966 were re-designated as medium endurance cutters, WMEC.

Construction and career 
Morris was laid down and launched by American Brown Boveri Electric Corporation, Camden on 4 April 1927. She was commissioned on 19 April 1927.

Her command was transferred to the US Navy in 1941 until 1946.

The Morris, identifiable by its "W147" marking, plays a prominent role in a 1961 episode of the television series Perry Mason entitled "The Case of the Traveling Treasure."

In May 1966, she was redesignated as WMEC-147.

USCGC Morris was the last Active-class to be decommissioned. She is preserved at the Liberty Maritime Museum in Sacramento, California since 2015.

In 2019 the ship was listed for sale on Craigslist.

It was announced in May 2021 that the Marine Aviation Museum in Texas had acquired the ship and preparations were underway to sail her to Texas under her own power.

She transited the Panama Canal in August 2021 and arrived in Galveston, Texas on September 8, 2021.

See also
Rum Patrol

Citations

References

Websites
  
 
 
 

Active-class patrol boats
1927 ships
Ships built in Camden, New Jersey
World War II patrol vessels of the United States
Ships of the United States Coast Guard
Museum ships in California
Brown, Boveri & Cie